Quiabentia zehntneri is a species of plant in the family Cactaceae. It is endemic to Brazil.  Its natural habitats are subtropical or tropical dry forests and subtropical or tropical dry shrubland. It is threatened by habitat loss.

References

External links

Flora of Brazil
zehntneri
Least concern plants
Taxonomy articles created by Polbot